Gillingwater is a surname. Notable people with the surname include:

Claude Gillingwater (1870–1939), American actor
Michelle Gillingwater Pedersen (born 1987), Gibraltarian beauty queen, Miss Gibraltar 2011
Richard Gillingwater (born 1956), British businessman